Lee Ki-hyung (born 28 September 1974) is a South Korean professional football manager and former player who is the current manager of Seongnam FC.

International career
Nicknamed the "Cannon shooter", Lee was a full-back who showed the strongest shot in South Korea. He played for South Korea in the 1996 Summer Olympics and the 1996 AFC Asian Cup. He also participated in qualifiers of the 1998 FIFA World Cup, but failed to be selected for the World Cup team by manager Cha Bum-kun.

Career statistics

Club

International
Results list South Korea's goal tally first.

Honours
Suwon Samsung Bluewings
K League 1: 1998, 1999
Korean FA Cup: 2002
Korean League Cup: 1999, 1999+, 2000, 2001
Korean Super Cup: 1999, 2000
Asian Club Championship: 2000–01, 2001–02
Asian Super Cup: 2001, 2002

Seongnam Ilhwa Chunma
K League 1: 2003
Korean League Cup: 2004
AFC Champions League runner-up: 2004

FC Seoul
Korean League Cup: 2006

Auckland City
New Zealand Football Championship: 2008–09

Notes

References

External links
 
 Lee Ki-hyung – National Team stats at KFA 
 
 

1974 births
Living people
Association football defenders
South Korean footballers
South Korean expatriate footballers
South Korea international footballers
Suwon Samsung Bluewings players
Seongnam FC players
FC Seoul players
Auckland City FC players
K League 1 players
Expatriate association footballers in New Zealand
Footballers at the 1996 Summer Olympics
Olympic footballers of South Korea
Sportspeople from South Jeolla Province
South Korean expatriate sportspeople in New Zealand
Korea University alumni
New Zealand Football Championship players
South Korean football managers
FC Seoul non-playing staff
Incheon United FC managers
Busan IPark managers
Seongnam FC managers